Moschowhaitsia is an extinct genus of therocephalian theriodonts from the Changxingian Archosaurus Assemblage Zone. It was among the larger carnivores in the faunal assemblages it occurred in.

See also
 List of therapsids

References

Whaitsiids
Prehistoric synapsids of Europe
Prehistoric synapsids of Asia
Permian synapsids
Fossil taxa described in 1963
Therocephalia genera